R. Deon Walker (born January 21, 1970), better known by his ring name, Rukkus, is an American professional wrestler. Though he has mainly appeared with NWA Wildside and Georgia Championship Wrestling, Rukkus has also competed for WWF in a dark match in May 2000. He also appeared in a host of indie shows throughout the US and UK.

Career
R. Deon Walker was a professional wrestling fan from an early age, and while attending the U.S.N.A. he began training at Sammy Kent's Pro-Wrestling School. In June 1994, at twenty-four (24) Walker made his professional wrestling debut on television for Georgia Championship Wrestling as Dr. D.O.A., a wrestler and body guard for Manager Big Tex. Walker wrestled until May 2000, when he made a dark match appearance at the Georgia Dome against one of his trainers, Bull Buchanan.

Championships and accomplishments
Georgia Championship Wrestling 
Georgia Championship Lightweight Championship (1 time)
NWA Wildside
NWA Wildside Heavyweight Championship (1 time)
NWA Wildside Tag Team Championship (1 time)

References

External links
 NWA-Wildside / Worldwide - Talent Photo Gallery

1970 births
American male professional wrestlers
Living people
Professional wrestlers from Georgia (U.S. state)
20th-century professional wrestlers
21st-century professional wrestlers
NWA Georgia Heavyweight Champions
NWA Georgia Tag Team Champions